Tesfaye Deriba Ketema (born 11 September 1998) is an Ethiopian runner specialising in the 3000 metres steeplechase. He represented his country at the 2017 World Championships finishing seventh in the final.

His personal best in the event is 8:13.33 set in Hengelo in 2017.

In 2019, he represented Ethiopia at the 2019 African Games held in Rabat, Morocco. He competed in the men's 3000 metres steeplechase and he finished in 9th place.

International competitions

References

1998 births
Living people
Ethiopian male steeplechase runners
World Athletics Championships athletes for Ethiopia
Athletes (track and field) at the 2019 African Games
African Games competitors for Ethiopia
21st-century Ethiopian people